A norm entrepreneur is someone interested in changing social norms. Cass Sunstein coined the term in his 1996 paper Social Norms and Social Roles. He notes there that existing social conditions can frequently be more fragile than is typically supposed as they depend on social norms to which many may not be strongly allied. Sunstein identifies a category of people, who he calls norm entrepreneurs, who are interested in changing social norms. If they are successful in their endeavors they can produce what he calls norm bandwagons and norm cascades which lead to substantial changes in social norms.

Wunderlich (2020) provides an overview of norms research and discusses the ways in which international norms have emerged and develop. She defines norm entrepreneurship and provides a  taxonomy of differing types of norm entrepreneurs; exploring their motives, objectives and deliminating their tools and conditions for their success. She argues there is a bias towards  “feel-good” norm Entrepreneurship.

See also 
Moral entrepreneur
Social norm

References 

Sociological terminology